Sanya Malhotra (born 25 February 1992) is an Indian actress who works in Hindi films. She began her career with supporting roles in the biographical sports film Dangal (2016) and the comedy Badhaai Ho (2018), both of which rank among the highest-grossing Indian films.

Malhotra received nominations for the Filmfare Critics Award for Best Actress for her roles in the drama Photograph (2019) and the black comedy Ludo (2020), and also received praise for starring in the streaming films Shakuntala Devi (2020), Pagglait (2021) and 
Love Hostel (2022).

Early life and background
Malhotra was born and raised in Delhi, India. She is a trained dancer in contemporary and ballet. After graduating from Gargi College, Malhotra participated in the dance reality show Dance India Dance and made it to the top 100. She moved to Mumbai, where she began appearing in auditions and began assisting camerapersons for television commercials. She was later contacted by the film casting director Mukesh Chhabra.

Career

Early work and recognition (2016–2019) 
Malhotra was selected for Nitesh Tiwari's biographical sports film Dangal along with Fatima Sana Shaikh, who was also relatively new. Before the film, she said that she did not know much about wrestling. She then watched several videos on wrestling and "how wrestlers move, walk, their body language" and also did the training. Both Malhotra and Sheikh went through five rounds of auditions, physical training and workshops with Tiwari and Aamir Khan. They were trained by coach and former wrestler Kripa Shankar Patel Bishnoi. Released in 2016, Dangal received critical acclaim and became the highest-grossing Indian film ever with earnings of more than  worldwide. Anupama Chopra said in her review that Malhotra provides "strong support" to the story. Malhotra later choreographed the song "Sexy Baliye" for the Secret Superstar (2017), which featured Khan.

Two years later, Malhotra starred in Vishal Bhardwaj's drama Pataakha (2018) alongside newcomer Radhika Madan. . Based on the short story Do Behnen by Charan Singh Pathik, it tells the story of two warring sisters in Rajasthan. The story was based on the wives of Pathik's brothers. To prepare for the film, both she and Madan met the real inspiration behind the characters to learn their nuances. The two stayed in Ronsi village near Jaipur and learned the Rajasthani dialect; they also got accustomed to milking buffaloes, thatching roofs, plastering the walls with dung and walking for long distances while balancing matkas full of water on their head and another around their waist. They also had to put on 10 kg of weight. Critic Raja Sen found Malhotra to be a "fearless actress" and thought that she "plays this character with unhinged enthusiasm". In the same year, she took on a supporting role in Amit Sharma's critically and commercially successful comedy Badhaai Ho, starring Ayushmann Khurrana.

In 2019, Malhotra starred in Ritesh Batra's Photograph. The film follows a street photographer Rafi, played by Nawazuddin Siddiqui, who tries to convince a student Miloni (Malhotra) to pose as his fiancée so that his grandmother stops pressuring him to get married. It was screened at the 2019 Sundance Film Festival and at the 69th Berlin International Film Festival. The Hollywood Reporter featured her in their listing of "breakout talent" from the latter festival. Rahul Desai of Film Companion gave Photograph a positive review and wrote that Malhotra "becomes the dreamy-eyed participant that enables the film to embrace its quiet glances and gentle flights of fantasy." Malhotra was nominated for the Filmfare Critics Award for Best Actress for the film.

Streaming films (2020–present) 

Malhotra's two films of 2020—the biographical film Shakuntala Devi and the black comedy Ludo—were initially planned for theatrical release. However, due to the COVID-19 pandemic in India, they were released directly on Amazon Prime Video and Netflix respectively. Shakuntala Devi, directed by Anu Menon, is about the mathematician of the same name and starred Vidya Balan in the titular role, with Malhotra portraying Devi's daughter Anupama. Mike McCahill of The Guardian found Malhotra to be "quietly affecting" in her part and commended her for holding her own opposite her co-star. Anurag Basu's anthology film, Ludo, featured her alongside an ensemble cast. India Todays Nairita Mukherjee took note of the "outstanding camaraderie" between Malhotra and her co-star Aditya Roy Kapur. For her performance in Ludo, she received another nomination for the Filmfare Critics Award for Best Actress.

Malhotra's first two films of 2021 were released on Netflix. In the black comedy Pagglait, she starred as a young widow who discovers her late-husband's infidelity. Critic Anna M. M. Vetticad found her to be aptly cast in a subtle part. She received a Best Actress nomination at the Filmfare OTT Awards. Malhotra then starred alongside Abhimanyu Dassani as newlyweds in the romantic comedy  Meenakshi Sundareshwar. The film received criticism for its stereotypical representation of Tamil people. 

In 2022, she starred in the ZEE5 film Love Hostel, a thriller about honour killing, opposite Vikrant Massey. Sukanya Verma of Rediff wrote that both Massey and Malhotra "effortlessly convey the flavour of the world they inhabit". Malhotra had a small role opposite Rajkummar Rao in the thriller HIT: The First Case, a remake of the Telugu film of the same name.

Malhotra will next star in the Netflix satirical film Kathal, about a small-town cop in pursuit of a missing jackfruit. She will also feature in the action film Jawan, starring Shah Rukh Khan and Nayanthara, and in the biopic Sam Bahadur, starring Vicky Kaushal as Sam Manekshaw.

Filmography

Films

Accolades

References

External links

 
 
 

1992 births
Living people
Indian film actresses
Actresses from Delhi
Actresses in Hindi cinema
21st-century Indian actresses
Gargi College alumni